Chevrolet Lumina may refer to the following General Motors vehicles:

 Chevrolet Lumina, a front-wheel drive sedan and coupé sold in North America from 1989 to 2001
 Chevrolet Lumina APV, a front-wheel drive minivan sold in North America from 1989 to 1997
 Holden Commodore, a rebadged rear-wheel drive sedan and coupé utility sold in the Middle East, South Africa and Southeast Asia from 1998 to 2011
 Holden Monaro, a rebadged rear-wheel drive coupé sold in the Middle East and South Africa from 2001 to 2006
 Buick Regal, a rebadged front-wheel drive sedan sold in the Philippines from 2005 to 2006